Roberto Badillo Martínez (born 7 June 1938) is a Mexican retired military general and politician from the Institutional Revolutionary Party. From 2006 to 2009 he served as Deputy of the LX Legislature of the Mexican Congress representing Veracruz.

References

1938 births
Living people
Politicians from Veracruz
Mexican generals
Institutional Revolutionary Party politicians
21st-century Mexican politicians
20th-century Mexican military personnel
Deputies of the LX Legislature of Mexico
Members of the Chamber of Deputies (Mexico) for Veracruz